Vudu is an American digital video store and streaming service owned by Fandango Media, a joint-venture between NBCUniversal and Warner Bros. Discovery. The company offers transactional video on demand rentals and digital purchases of films, as well as integration with digital locker services for streaming digital copies of films purchased as home video at retail.

The service initially focused on a digital media player known as the Vudu Box. In 2010, the company began to abandon its hardware business, and focus on integrating its service and associated app platform into third-party devices such as televisions and Blu-ray Disc players. The company has since offered its services online, via mobile apps, and on devices such as digital media players and smart TVs.

In 2010, Vudu was sold to Walmart. In 2020, Fandango Media acquired Vudu for an undisclosed amount.

History
Vudu was founded by Tony Miranz and Alain Rossmann (the creator of WAP). The Vudu Box had been secretly in development since 2004, but in April 2007, The New York Times revealed Vudu had signed deals with several movie studios and independent distributors to deliver access to nearly 5,000 films.

, Vudu had received $21 million in venture capital funding from Greylock Partners and Benchmark Capital. The company is based in Santa Clara, California.

In May 2008, Vudu began displaying and selling its set-top box in Best Buy stores. Before this, the box was only available via online retailers. In October, Vudu announced that it would begin to stream films in 1080p high definition, branded as "HDX". These films would feature a series of encoding and processing techniques branded as "TruFilm", including the dampening of artifacting and pixelation associated with darker areas of pictures, film grain preservation, "color gradient processing" to improve appearance on flat-panel televisions, and "statistical variable bitrate" to optimize streaming performance.

On February 24, 2009, Vudu became the first on-demand service to offer high-definition movies for download to own. Prior to Vudu allowing users to purchase high-definition movies, studios only allowed their films to be purchased in standard-definition format. LG was the first to integrate Vudu into its HDTVs, with access beginning in August 2009 through the television's NetCast application.

On January 8, 2010, at Consumer Electronics Show, Vudu announced that it would phase out its in-house hardware business in favor of focusing on integration of its rich Internet application platform, "Vudu Apps" (which featured Vudu as well as other streaming video and internet services), directly into internet-connected televisions and Blu-ray players, with initial hardware partners including LG, Magnavox, Mitsubishi, Samsung, Sanyo, Sharp, Toshiba, and Vizio.

On February 22, 2010, Walmart announced its intent to acquire Vudu. The company had previously attempted to offer digital video sales in 2007, but the service folded due to competition with the iTunes Store. In order to comply with Walmart's content policies, Vudu subsequently discontinued its "After Dark" service (a collaboration with AVN), which offered pornographic content.

In 2012, Vudu partnered with UltraViolet, an industry-backed digital locker offering online streaming of retail DVD and Blu-ray disc purchases. In 2014, Vudu also joined Disney's competing Movies Anywhere initiative.

In February 2020, it was reported that Comcast (via NBCUniversal) had entered talks into acquiring Vudu from Walmart.

In April 2020, it was announced that NBCUniversal subsidiary Fandango Media would acquire Vudu for an undisclosed amount; the sale closed on July 6, 2020. Fandango is minority owned by Warner Bros., and operates the similar service FandangoNOW. As part of the sale, Walmart will maintain its relationships with Vudu, including account integration and promotion of the service via Walmart's website.

On August 3, 2021, FandangoNOW was merged into Vudu, with Vudu replacing FandangoNOW as the official video store on the Roku platform. Fandango chose to retain the "Vudu" name as it was the larger service with a loyal customer base.

Content 
As of June 2019, Vudu's selection contains over 24,000 titles in their catalog and over 8,000 television shows. Titles range from major motion pictures, independent films, documentaries, children's programming, anime, musicals, recorded musical performances, cartoons, and television series. Vudu has established content licensing contracts with all major movie studios as well as over 50 smaller and independent studios. Films are available to rent in standard-definition, high-definition, and 4K ultra high definition formats, with Dolby Atmos, Dolby Vision, and HDR10 available on supported devices and content.

In October 2016, Vudu added a free, ad-supported streaming library to its platform in the United States branded as "Movies on Us", featuring recent and classic films.

In October 2018, Vudu partnered with MGM Television to develop and acquire original programming for Movies on Us, with a focus on "family-friendly, advertiser-friendly content" derived from existing MGM properties. Vudu premiered its first original series, Mr. Mom—a continuation of the 1983 film of the same name, on September 12, 2019.

See also 

Over-the-top media service
Interactive television
 Internet television

References

External links 

Advertising video on demand
American entertainment websites
Transactional video on demand
Internet properties established in 2004
Companies based in Sunnyvale, California
Fandango
2020 mergers and acquisitions